The Großer Galtenberg is the highest mountain in the Alpbach valley in the Austrian state of Tyrol and belongs to the Kitzbühel Alps. The Alpbachtal ski region is located opposite the  Galtenberg.
From the summit there are views of Wildschönau and the Alpbach valley.

See also
 Tyrol Schistose Alps

References

Mountains of the Alps
Mountains of Tyrol (state)
Two-thousanders of Austria
Kitzbühel Alps